Peshawar Radio Station (Urdu پشاور ریڈیو اسٹیشن ) is the oldest in Pakistan, opening in 1935. When Abdul Qayyum Khan, a political leader of North-West Frontier Province Pakistan, went to London during the Round Table Conference of 1930-1932 he  met Marconi, who had invented the wireless telegraph, and requested him to donate a radio transmitter for the N.W.F.P. Soon after the gift from Marconi arrived. The transmitter, personally engineered by Marconi, was installed in Peshawar and inaugurated by Sir Ralph Edwin Hotchkin Griffith, the Governor of North-West Frontier Province in 1935.

Famous associated persons
Patras Bokhari,
Ahmad Nadeem Qasmi

References

Radio stations in Pakistan
Radio stations established in 1935